Juliane Koepcke (born 10 October 1954), also known by her married name Juliane Diller, is a German-Peruvian mammalogist who specialises in bats. The daughter of German zoologists Maria and Hans-Wilhelm Koepcke, she became famous at the age of 17 as the sole survivor of the 1971 LANSA Flight 508 plane crash; after falling  while strapped to her seat and suffering numerous injuries, she survived 11 days alone in the Amazon rainforest until local fishermen rescued her.

Early life 
Koepcke was born in Lima on 10 October 1954, the only child of German zoologists Maria (née von Mikulicz-Radecki; 1924–1971) and Hans-Wilhelm Koepcke (1914–2000). Her parents were working at Lima's Museum of Natural History when she was born. At the age of 14, she left Lima with her parents to establish the Panguana research station in the Amazon rainforest, where she learned survival skills. Educational authorities disapproved and she was required to return to the Deutsche Schule Lima Alexander von Humboldt to take her exams, graduating on 23 December 1971.

Crash 
On 24 December 1971, just one day after she graduated, Koepcke flew on LANSA Flight 508. Her mother Maria had wanted to return to Panguana with Koepcke on 19 or 20 December 1971, but Koepcke wanted to attend her graduation ceremony in Lima on 23 December. Maria agreed that Koepcke could stay longer and instead they scheduled a flight for Christmas Eve. All flights were booked except for one with LANSA. Koepcke's father, Hans-Wilhelm, urged his wife to avoid flying with the airline due to its poor reputation. Nonetheless, the flight was booked. The plane was struck by lightning mid-flight and began to disintegrate before plummeting to the ground. Koepcke found herself still strapped to her seat, falling  into the Amazon rainforest.

Koepcke survived the fall but suffered injuries such as a broken collarbone, a deep cut in her right arm, an eye injury, and a concussion. She then spent 11 days in the rainforest, most of which were spent making her way through the water. While in the jungle, she dealt with severe insect bites and an infestation of maggots in her wounded arm. After nine days, she was able to find an encampment that had been set up by local fishermen. She gave herself rudimentary first aid, which included pouring gasoline on her arm to force the maggots out of the wound. A few hours later, the returning fishermen found her, gave her proper first aid, and used a canoe to transport her to a more inhabited area. She was soon airlifted to a hospital.

Koepcke's unlikely survival has been the subject of much speculation. Experts have said that she survived the fall because she was harnessed into her seat, which was in the middle of her row, and the two seats on either side of her (which remained attached to her seat as part of a row of three) are thought to have functioned as a parachute which slowed her fall. The impact may have also been lessened by the updraft from a thunderstorm Koepcke fell through, as well as the thick foliage at her landing site. As many as 14 other passengers were later discovered to have survived the initial crash, but died while waiting to be rescued.

Aftermath 

After recovering from her injuries, Koepcke assisted search parties in locating the crash site and recovering the bodies of victims. Her mother's body was discovered on 12 January 1972.

Koepcke returned to her parents' native Germany, where she fully recovered from her injuries. Like her parents, she studied biology at the University of Kiel and graduated in 1980. She received a doctorate from Ludwig Maximilian University of Munich and returned to Peru to conduct research in mammalogy, specialising in bats. She published her thesis, "Ecological study of a bat colony in the tropical rain forest of Peru", in 1987.

In 1989, Koepcke married Erich Diller, a German entomologist who specialises in parasitic wasps. In 2000, following the death of her father, she took over as the director of Panguana. She currently serves as a librarian at the Bavarian State Collection of Zoology in Munich.

Koepcke's autobiography Als ich vom Himmel fiel: Wie mir der Dschungel mein Leben zurückgab (German for When I Fell from the Sky: How the Jungle Gave Me My Life Back) was released in 2011 by Piper Verlag. The book won that year's Corine Literature Prize. In 2019, the government of Peru made her a Grand Officer of the Order of Merit for Distinguished Services.

Portrayal in media 
Koepcke's survival has been the subject of numerous books and films, including the low-budget and heavily fictionalized I miracoli accadono ancora (1974) by Italian filmmaker Giuseppe Maria Scotese, which was released in English as Miracles Still Happen and is sometimes called The Story of Juliane Koepcke. She was portrayed by English actress Susan Penhaligon in the film.

Koepcke's story was more faithfully told by Koepcke herself in German filmmaker Werner Herzog's documentary Wings of Hope (1998). Herzog was interested in telling her story because of a personal connection; he was scheduled to be on the same flight while scouting locations for his film Aguirre, the Wrath of God (1972), but a last-minute change of plans spared him from the crash. He had planned to make the film ever since narrowly missing the flight, but was unable to contact Koepcke for decades since she avoided the media; he located her after contacting the priest who performed her mother's funeral. Koepcke accompanied him on a visit to the crash site, which she described as a "kind of therapy" for her.

Works

See also 
 Nicholas Alkemade, British soldier who survived falling from his aeroplane in 1944
 Ivan Chisov, Soviet soldier who survived falling from his aeroplane in 1942
 Alan Magee, American soldier who survived falling from his aeroplane in 1943
 Vesna Vulović, Serbian flight attendant who survived the mid-air breakup of JAT Flight 367 in 1972
 Larisa Savitskaya, Soviet woman who was the sole survivor of Aeroflot Flight 811 in 1981
 List of sole survivors of aviation accidents or incidents

References

External links 
 Plane Crashes Since 1970 with a Sole Survivor. airsafe.com
 

1954 births
Living people
People from Lima
Peruvian people of German descent
German mammalogists
German librarians
German women librarians
Fall survivors
Sole survivors
Survivors of aviation accidents or incidents
Peruvian librarians
Peruvian biologists
Women mammalogists